Bank Eskhata is a major bank in Tajikistan, providing a full range of banking services.  Bank Eskhata's network has 23 branch offices, 262 banking centers and 139 money transfer locations throughout Tajikistan.

JSC "Eskhata Bank" is an open joint-stock company established as a commercial bank on the basis of the founder's decision on November 16, 1993 in the Republic of Tajikistan. On May 28, 1999, based on the decision of the founders' meeting, it was transformed into the "Eskhata" joint-stock commercial bank. On September 12, 2002, it was registered as an open joint-stock company "Eskhata Bank".

References 

Banks of Tajikistan